Broer is a surname. Notable people with the surname include:

Bert Broer (1916–1991), Dutch physicist and mathematician
Henk Broer (born 1950), Dutch mathematician
Jan-Martin Bröer (born 1982), German rower

See also
Broeren
Broers